Touchard is a French surname. Notable people with the surname include:

Albert Touchard (1876–between 1935 and 1945), French author
Gustave F. Touchard (1888–1918), American tennis player
Jacques Touchard (1885–1968), French mathematician
Touchard polynomials

See also
Bouchard

French-language surnames